The 2019 Campeonato Internacional de Tênis de Campinas was a professional tennis tournament played on clay courts. It was the eighth edition of the tournament which was part of the 2019 ATP Challenger Tour. It took place in Campinas, Brazil between 30 September and 6 October 2019.

Singles main-draw entrants

Seeds

 1 Rankings as of 23 September 2019.

Other entrants
The following players received wildcards into the singles main draw:
  Pedro Boscardin Dias
  Gilbert Klier Júnior
  Rafael Matos
  Matheus Pucinelli de Almeida
  João Lucas Reis da Silva

The following players received entry from the qualifying draw:
  Daniel Dutra da Silva
  Fernando Romboli

Champions

Singles

  Juan Pablo Varillas def.  Juan Pablo Ficovich 2–6, 7–6(7–4), 6–2.

Doubles

  Orlando Luz /  Rafael Matos def.  Miguel Ángel Reyes-Varela /  Fernando Romboli 6–7(2–7), 6–4, [10–8].

References

Campeonato Internacional de Tênis de Campinas
2019
2019 in Brazilian tennis
September 2019 sports events in South America
October 2019 sports events in South America